The Kyle Petty Charity Ride Across America is an annual, cross-country motorcycle ride that travels to raise awareness and funds for Victory Junction, a camp created to enrich the lives of children with chronic or life-threatening medical illnesses. One of the most successful and popular charity events in the country, the Ride engages celebrities, sponsors, motorcycle enthusiasts, fans and local communities. The Ride was founded in 1995 by NASCAR driver Kyle Petty.

About

The Kyle Petty Charity Ride Across America is a week-long motorcycle trek through various cities nationwide. Since the Ride began in 1995, more than 7,950 riders have logged 11.6 million cumulative motorcycle miles and raised $17.5 million for Victory Junction and other children's charities.

Beneficiaries

Victory Junction
 
Since its inception by Kyle in 2004 in honor of his late son Adam, Victory Junction has served as the Ride's primary beneficiary. Located on 84 acres in Randleman, North Carolina, Victory Junction exists to enrich the lives of children with chronic or life-threatening illnesses by creating camping experiences that are memorable, fun, empowering, physically safe and medically sound. As a result of the Ride, 7,985 children have attended Victory Junction at no cost to their families. Every week of summer, up to 120 kids can go to the camp for 5 days.

History

The inspiration for the Ride came in 1994, when Petty and three friends rode their motorcycles from North Carolina to a NASCAR race at Phoenix International Raceway. Friends joined the ride along the way, and by the time the group reached Phoenix, it had grown to 30 riders. The turnout inspired Petty, and he decided to nurture the event into something bigger; thus the Kyle Petty Charity Ride Across America was born.

Over the years, many celebrities have participated in the ride, including many NASCAR legends and personalities like Richard Petty, Donnie Allison, Harry Gant, Hershel McGriff, Tony Stewart and Matt Kenseth. Other notable riders have included John Boy and Billy, Paul Teutul Sr., Rutledge Wood, Davis Love III, Herschel Walker, and Brad Daugherty.

There was one event casualty: in 2020 when the Ride was cancelled on COVID-19 pandemic grounds.

References

External links
 Official website
 Victory Junction website

1995 establishments in the United States
Children's charities based in the United States
Health-related fundraisers
Kyle Petty
Recurring events established in 1995